XEOCH-AM is a radio station in Ocosingo, Chiapas. Broadcasting on 600 kHz, XEOCH is part of the Sistema Chiapaneco de Radio, Televisión y Cinematografía state network and is known as Ki'n Radio.

History

XEOCH came to air on March 20, 1992. Its name in Tseltal means "fiesta" or "party".

In November 2017, the IFT awarded a separate FM public concession to the Sistema Chiapaneco de Radio, Televisión y Cinematografía for XHOCH-FM 103.3, a class A FM station. This was never built, with the state government surrendering it on May 25, 2021, citing budget reallocation due to COVID-19.

References

Public radio in Mexico
Radio stations in Chiapas